The Aung Zeya-class frigate is a frigate operated by the Myanmar Navy. The lead ship of the class is named after Aung Zeya (Alaungpaya), the founder of Konbaung Dynasty of Myanmar. UMS Aung Zeya (F-11) is the first indigenous guided missile frigate of the Myanmar Navy.

As of 2021, the lead ship (F-11) is the only ship in this class.

See also

References

Bibliography
 
 
 

Ship classes built by Myanmar Navy
Frigates of the Myanmar Navy
Frigate classes
Post–Cold War military equipment of Myanmar